Qullpayuq (Quechua qullpa salty, saltpeter, -yuq a suffix, "the one with saltpeter", also spelled Culpayo) is a mountain in the Andes of Peru which reaches an altitude of approximately . It is located in the Junín Region, Yauli Province, on the border of the districts of Carhuacayán and Marcapomacocha. Qullpayuq lies northwest of the mountain and lake named Muruqucha, north of a lake called Yanaqucha ("black lake").

References

Mountains of Peru
Mountains of Junín Region